Martin Fitzgerald (1867 – 9 March 1927) was an Irish politician. Born in what is now Casey's Hardware Store on Main Street, Charlestown, County Mayo, he moved to Dublin at an early age. He was an independent member of Seanad Éireann from 1922 to 1927. He was nominated to the Seanad by the President of the Executive Council in 1922 for 12 years. He died in office in 1927.

References

1867 births
1927 deaths
Politicians from County Mayo
Independent members of Seanad Éireann
Members of the 1922 Seanad
Members of the 1925 Seanad